The Khazar Lankaran 2010–11 season is Khazar Lankaran's fifth Azerbaijan Premier League season. It was Khazar's first season under Agaselim Mirjavadov. Khazar finished the season in 4th place and where runners-up in the Azerbaijan Cup.

Squad

Transfers

Summer

In:

Out:

Winter

In:

Out:

Competitions

Azerbaijan Premier League

Results

League table

Azerbaijan Premier League Championship Group

Results

Table

Azerbaijan Cup

Squad statistics

Appearances and goals

|-
|colspan="14"|Players who appeared for Khazar Lankaran who left during the season:

|}

Goal scorers

Disciplinary record

References
Qarabağ have played their home games at the Tofiq Bahramov Stadium since 1993 due to the ongoing situation in Quzanlı.

External links 
 Khazar Lankaran at Soccerway.com

Khazar Lankaran FK seasons
Khazar Lankaran